West Zealand County is a former county (Danish: amt) in the west-central part of the island of Zealand (Sjælland) in eastern Denmark. The county was formed on 1 April 1970, comprising a few former counties. The county was abolished effective January 1, 2007, when it merged into Region Sjælland (i.e. Region Zealand).

The county was responsible for public hospitals, upper secondary schools and schools for Higher Preparatory Examination, public transport and social welfare for the disabled.

The County Hall was located in the town of Sorø, and became the seat of the new region. Sorø is by no means the biggest city in West Zealand, but it has great historical value. It is famed for the Sorø Academy (Danish, Sorø Akademi), an educational institution built in 1140 together with the church where Queen Margaret I of Denmark was buried (later moved to Roskilde Domkirke, Roskilde).

Many people who live in West Zealand commute to the greater metropolitan area of Copenhagen for work.

List of County Mayors

Municipalities (1970-2006)

References

External links 
 West Zealand County website - list of county mayors
 The Association of County Councils
 Tourist information
 Sorø Akademi

Former counties of Denmark (1970–2006)
Region Zealand
States and territories established in 1970
States and territories disestablished in 2006